Katrina Wright (born 1981) is an Australian international lawn bowler.

Wright made her Australian debut in 2004 and won the silver medal in the triples at the 2004 World Outdoor Bowls Championship.

References

Living people
1981 births
Australian female bowls players
21st-century Australian women